The 2011 King Cup of Champions, or The Custodian of the Two Holy Mosques Cup, was the 36th season of King Cup of Champions since its establishment in 1957, and the 4th under the current edition.

The tournament was won by Al-Ahli, who beat defending champions Al-Ittihad 4–2 on penalties in the final. It was their first title in current edition and eleventh title overall, they also qualified for 2012 AFC Champions League.

Participating teams

* Number of appearance in King Cup of Champions since the 2008 season .

Fixtures and results

Bracket

Quarter-finals
Quarter-finals were played on 28, 29 May and 10, 11 June 2011.

|}

First Leg

Notes

Second Leg

Semi-finals
Semi-finals were played on 15, 16, 19 & 20 June 2011.

|}

First Leg

Second Leg

Third place
Third place game was played on 23 June 2011.

Final

Winner

References

2011
2010–11 in Saudi Arabian football
2010–11 domestic association football cups